The men's marathon event at the 2010 Asian Games was held in Guangzhou Triathlon Venue, Guangzhou on 27 November.

Schedule
All times are China Standard Time (UTC+08:00)

Records

Results 
Legend
DNF — Did not finish

References

Results

Athletics at the 2010 Asian Games
2010
2010 Asian Games
Asian
2010 Asian Games